Clark County is the southernmost county in the U.S. state of Washington. As of the 2020 census, the population was 503,311, making it Washington's fifth-most populous county. Its county seat and largest city is Vancouver. It was the first county in Washington, first named Vancouver County in 1845 before being renamed for William Clark of the Lewis and Clark Expedition in 1849. It was created by the Provisional Government of Oregon in Oregon Country on August 20, 1845, and at that time covered the entire present-day state. Clark County is the third-most-populous county in the Portland-Vancouver-Hillsboro Metropolitan Statistical Area, and is across the Columbia River from Portland, Oregon.

History
Clark County was created on August 20, 1845 as Vancouver District, named for its town, following the removal of the area from three other districts on July 27, 1844. It included all the land north of the Columbia River, west of the Rocky Mountains, and south of Alaska.  On December 21, 1845 the provisional government changed its name to Vancouver County. At that time it stretched from the Columbia River to 54 degrees 40 minutes North Latitude in what is now British Columbia, Canada. On June 15, 1846, the United States Senate approved the present boundary between the U.S. and Canada at the 49th parallel.

On August 13, 1848, President James K. Polk signed an act creating the entire region as the Oregon Territory.  On September 3, 1849, the Oregon Territorial Legislature modified the borders again and changed its name to Clarke County in honor of explorer William Clark. At this time it included all of present-day Washington and continued to be divided and subdivided until reaching its present area in 1880. It was not until 1925 that the spelling was corrected to its present form.

In September 1902 the Yacolt Burn, the largest fire in state history, began in neighboring Skamania County and swept west along a 12-mile front to Yacolt, nearly engulfing the town.  Salvaging the remaining timber was a lucrative industry for a time.

Geography 
It is the fifth-smallest county in Washington by land area.

Clark County is surrounded on two sides by the Columbia River and on the north by the North Fork of the Lewis River.  The East Fork of the Lewis River and the Washougal River cut across the county.  The largest stream arising solely within the county is Salmon Creek, which terminates at Vancouver Lake before eventually flowing into the Columbia River.

Like most of Oregon and Washington south of Puget Sound into the Willamette Valley the landscape and climate of Clark County are determined by its placement between the volcanic Pacific Coast and Cascade Ranges, where glaciation helped form a U-shaped valley which meets the river valley of the Columbia River as it leaves the Columbia River Gorge.  Volcanic andisol soils are common, with fertile mollisols in the lower areas. The central and southwest areas of the county are generally flat floodplains, sculpted by torrents of prehistoric Lake Missoula. A series of dramatic floods known as the Missoula Floods took place 15,000–13,000 years ago, as several ice dams melted, forming a series of low steps such as the "Heights", "Mill Plain", "Fourth Plain" and "Fifth Plain". Clark County's Köppen climate classification is "Csb".

Many lakes border the river in the lowlands near Ridgefield, including Vancouver Lake. Larch Mountain is the county's highest free-standing peak.

Flora and fauna of the region include the normal ecological succession from lowland big leaf maple and western red cedar through Garry oak on up through fire-dependent species such as lodgepole pine and Douglas fir, as well as grand fir, silver fir and other species common to Gifford Pinchot National Forest. In addition to a wide variety of birds including great blue heron, raptors such as barred owl,  osprey, red-tailed hawk and bald eagle, corvids (raven, crow, California scrub and Steller's jay)  and others, the native streams are home to various species of salmon and the Vancouver Trout Hatchery. Larger mammals include black-tailed deer, coyote, raccoon, skunk and invasive opossum; with sightings of lynx, bobcat, black bear, cougar and elk not uncommon, especially in the northern parts of the county. Common foods used by the indigenous people such as the Klickitat tribe and Chinook included salmon, huckleberry and Camassia quamash (after which the city of Camas, Washington is named).

Mount Hood, Mount St. Helens and Mount Adams are all visible from Clark County, and cold winter winds through the Columbia River Gorge often bring freezing rain and a coating of glaze ice or clear ice known locally as a "silver thaw," especially in southeastern areas of the county closest to the gorge. The counterpart to this are warm winds from the southwest known locally as the "Pineapple Express".

Climate
Spring thaws can often swell county waterways, with two of the more destructive floods being those of the Columbia River in June 1894 and May, 1948. The 1948 Memorial Day flood almost topped the Interstate Bridge's support piers and completely destroyed nearby Vanport, Oregon. Construction of The Dalles Dam and destruction of Celilo Falls are credited with a decrease in such floods.

Significant windstorms in Clark County include the Columbus Day windstorm of October 12, 1962, and an April 6, 1972 tornado which rated F3 on the Fujita scale, striking a local school.

Geographic features

Major highways
 Interstate 5
 Interstate 205
 State Route 14
 State Route 500
 State Route 501
 State Route 502
 State Route 503

Former major highway
 U.S. Route 99
 U.S. Route 830
 State Route 120
 State Route 140

Adjacent counties
Cowlitz County - north
Skamania County - east
Multnomah County, Oregon - south
Columbia County, Oregon - southwest

National protected areas
 Fort Vancouver National Historic Site (part)
 Gifford Pinchot National Forest (part)
 Ridgefield National Wildlife Refuge
 Steigerwald Lake National Wildlife Refuge

Demographics

2000 census
As of the census of 2000, there were 345,238 people, 127,208 households, and 90,953 families residing in the county.  The population density was 550 people per square mile (212/km2).  There were 134,030 housing units at an average density of 213 per square mile (82/km2).  The racial makeup of the county was 88.82% White, 1.68% Black or African American, 0.84% Native American, 3.21% Asian, 0.37% Pacific Islander, 1.99% from other races, and 3.08% from two or more races.  4.71% of the population were Hispanic or Latino of any race. 17.7% were of German, 10.2% English, 8.6% Irish, 8.6% United States and 5.1% Norwegian ancestry. 88.8% spoke only English at home; 3.6% spoke Spanish and 1.9% Russian.

There were 127,208 households, out of which 37.20% had children under the age of 18 living with them, 56.80% were married couples living together, 10.30% had a female householder with no husband present, and 28.50% were non-families. 21.80% of all households were made up of individuals, and 6.80% had someone living alone who was 65 years of age or older.  The average household size was 2.69 and the average family size was 3.15.

In the county, the population was spread out, with 28.70% under the age of 18, 8.40% from 18 to 24, 30.80% from 25 to 44, 22.60% from 45 to 64, and 9.50% who were 65 years of age or older.  The median age was 34 years. For every 100 females, there were 98.50 males.  For every 100 females age 18 and over, there were 95.90 males.

The median income for a household in the county was $48,376, and the median income for a family was $54,016. Males had a median income of $41,337 versus $28,537 for females. The per capita income for the county was $21,448.  About 6.90% of families and 9.10% of the population were below the poverty line, including 11.70% of those under age 18 and 6.80% of those age 65 or over.

2010 census
As of the 2010 census, there were 425,363 people, 158,099 households, and 110,672 families residing in the county. The racial makeup of the county was 85.4% white, 4.1% Asian, 2.0% black or African American, 0.9% American Indian, 0.6% Pacific islander, 2.9% from other races, and 4.0% from two or more races. Those of Hispanic or Latino origin made up 7.6% of the population. In terms of ancestry, 24.4% were German, 13.1% were Irish, 13.1% were English, 5.7% were Norwegian, and 4.3% were American.

Of the 158,099 households, 36.3% had children under the age of 18 living with them, 53.6% were married couples living together, 11.3% had a female householder with no husband present, 30.0% were non-families, and 23.1% of all households were made up of individuals. The average household size was 2.67 and the average family size was 3.15. The median age was 36.7 years.

The median income for a household in the county was $58,262 and the median income for a family was $67,352. Males had a median income of $52,160 versus $38,167 for females. The per capita income for the county was $27,828. About 7.8% of families and 10.9% of the population were below the poverty line, including 14.9% of those under age 18 and 7.2% of those age 65 or over.

Religion
Clark County is religiously diverse, with no single group comprising 10% of the population. The four groups that exceed 1% are nondenominational Christian with 30,026 members, the Catholic Church with 26,886 members, The Church of Jesus Christ of Latter-day Saints with 20,793 members, and the Evangelical Lutheran Church of America with 4,827.
The area is also home to the nation's largest population of the Old Apostolic Lutheran Church with between 5,000 and 6,000 members living in the county. This is estimated because the Church doesn't keep membership rolls.

Emergency services
The Clark County Sheriff's Office is the local, county-level law enforcement agency serving Clark County, Washington. The sheriff's office was established in 1849 and is the oldest law enforcement organization in the state of Washington.  Sheriff John Horch and Undersheriff James Hansen lead the Clark County Sheriff's Office.

On March 16, 2014, Clark County Fire & Rescue commissioned the Mary Firstenburg, a new fireboat purchased with the financial support from a bequest from Firstenburg's family, and from a FEMA Port Security Grant.

Politics
Clark County is a swing county in U.S. presidential elections that recently has voted slightly more Republican than the state and nation as a whole. For example, in 2012 President Obama carried Clark County by a few hundred votes representing a fraction of a percent, he ran behind his national showing of a 3% margin.  George W. Bush carried the county twice, by 52% to 47% over John Kerry in 2004 and by 49% to 46% over Al Gore in 2000. Clark County usually votes for the winning presidential candidate. It voted for Ronald Reagan twice and for Bill Clinton twice. The last three presidential elections where Clark County did not vote for the national winner were 1968, when it voted for Humphrey over Nixon, and 1988, when it voted for Dukakis over Bush, as well as in 2016 when the county narrowly voted for Democratic nominee Hillary Clinton over Republican nominee and winner of the election Donald Trump. In the 2020 election, Joe Biden carried the county and significantly improved upon Hillary Clinton's margins and outperformed Trump by five percentage points. The county's legislative body is the Clark County Council which was created in 2014.

The current elected officials are:

 Assessor - Peter Van Nortwick (R)
 Auditor - Greg Kimsey (R)
 Clerk - Scott Weber (R)
 Councilors 
 District 1 Glen Yung (NP)
 District 2 Michelle Belkot (NP)
 District 3 Karen Bowerman - County Chair (NP)
 District 4 Gary Medvigy (NP)
 District 5 Sue Marshall (NP)
 Prosecuting Attorney - Tony Golik (D)
 Sheriff - John Horch (NP)
 Treasurer - Alishia Topper (NP)

Communities

Cities

Battle Ground
Camas
La Center
Ridgefield
Vancouver (county seat)
Washougal
Woodland (mostly in Cowlitz County)

Town
Yacolt

Census-designated places

Amboy
Barberton
Brush Prairie
Cherry Grove
Dollars Corner
Duluth
Felida
Fern Prairie
Five Corners
Hazel Dell
Hockinson
Lake Shore
Lewisville
Meadow Glade
Minnehaha
Mount Vista
Orchards
Salmon Creek
Venersborg
Walnut Grove

Unincorporated communities

Chelatchie
Etna
Fargher Lake
Heisson
Mill Plain

Education
School districts include:
 Battle Ground School District
 Camas School District
 Evergreen School District (Clark)
 Green Mountain School District
 Hockinson School District
 La Center School District
 Mount Pleasant School District
 Ridgefield School District
 Vancouver Public Schools
 Washougal School District
 Woodland School District

State-operated schools:
 Washington State School for the Blind
 Washington School for the Deaf

See also
National Register of Historic Places listings in Clark County, Washington
 Washington State University Vancouver

References

Further reading
 Available online through the Washington State Library's Classics in Washington History collection

External links
 Official county website
 Clark County place name histories.
 Clark County Historic Photographs
 Guide to Clark County Washington 

 
1845 establishments in Oregon Country
Populated places established in 1845
Columbia River Gorge
Portland metropolitan area counties
Western Washington